Exo from Exoplanet #1 – The Lost Planet was the first solo concert tour of Chinese-South Korean boy band Exo. The tour was officially announced on April 7, 2014, with tickets going on sale on April 16, 2014. The Lost Planet tour began in Seoul's Olympic Gymnastics Arena on May 23, 2014.

On May 21, 2014, SM Entertainment released an official statement stating that member Kris would not be joining EXO on their first solo concert tour after Kris filed a lawsuit against SM Entertainment a week prior. SM Entertainment also released a statement stating that Kris' merchandise for the concert would be cancelled and all of the posters at the concert venue were changed to only showcase the 11 remaining members.

On October 10, 2014, member Luhan filed a lawsuit against SM Entertainment, similar to former member Kris. He discontinued his participation in the Exo from Exoplanet #1 – The Lost Planet tour as the remaining 10 members continued the tour promotion without him.

Concerts

Seoul
 The Lost Planet tour was originally announced to have two concerts in Seoul with tickets for the two concerts selling out in 1.47 seconds. Due to the explosive response from fans, a third concert date was added for Seoul.

Hong Kong
 One June 4, 2014, during the second concert of Exo from Exoplanet #1 – The Lost Planet, there was a stage incident during the song 'Angel' involving member D.O. A system malfunction occurred with the wiring that was responsible for lifting D.O.'s flying stage, sending two fans to the hospital. Exo released apologies and concern for the two fans immediately following the concert. D.O. and Suho also went to the hospital to visit the fans. SM Entertainment also released an official explanation and apology for the incident and confirmed that they would pay for the medical expenses for the two injured fans.

Bangkok
 On September 12, 2014, member Luhan issued an apology via his official Weibo page, stating that he would be unable to attend the two shows in Bangkok, Thailand due to illness. Luhan reasoned long-term exhaustion, headaches, and insomnia for his absence during the two shows.

Setlist

Tour dates

References

External links
 

2014 concert tours
Exo concert tours
K-pop concerts